Bahar Doğan (born September 2, 1974) is a Turkish female long-distance runner, who is specialized in marathon running. She is coached by Ertan Hatipoğlu at Üsküdar Belediyespor.

She is the winner of 2012 Adana Half Marathon with 1:16.18.

Bahar Doğan represented Turkey at the 2008 Summer Olympics in Beijing in the marathon event finishing 50th. In 2011, she won the first edition of Darıca Half Marathon in a time 1:14:10. She qualified for participation in the marathon event at the  2012 Olympics in London, and finished in 63rd place.

She took the 5th place in the 10,000 m. event of 2013 Mediterranean Games held in Mersin, Turkey (35:27:48)

In 2015 she was banned for 2 years for 2011 biological passport irregularities.

Personal bests
According to All-Athletics records, her best times as of March 2012 are:
1500 m 4:28.90 - Ankara (TUR), 14.08.2010
3000 m 9:12.31 - Istanbul (TUR), 14.06.2009
5000 m 17:06.80 - Zenica (BIH), 03.09.2006
10,000 m 33:19.71 - Oslo (NOR), 04.06.2011
10 km road 36:30 - Istanbul (TUR), 14.05.2006
Half marathon 1:10:20 - Trabzon (TUR), 22.02.2009
Marathon 2:34:53 - Düsseldorf (GER), 08.05.2011

References

External links

1974 births
Living people
Sportspeople from İzmit
Turkish female long-distance runners
Doping cases in athletics
Turkish sportspeople in doping cases
Turkish female marathon runners
Olympic athletes of Turkey
Athletes (track and field) at the 2008 Summer Olympics
Kocaeli University alumni
Athletes (track and field) at the 2012 Summer Olympics
Athletes (track and field) at the 2013 Mediterranean Games
Mediterranean Games competitors for Turkey
20th-century Turkish sportswomen
21st-century Turkish sportswomen